Tyson Luke Fury (born 12 August 1988) is an English professional boxer. He is the current WBC heavyweight champion, having held the title since defeating Deontay Wilder in 2020. Previously, he held the unified WBA (Super), IBF, WBO, IBO, and The Ring magazine titles after defeating Wladimir Klitschko in 2015. With his defeat of Wilder, Fury became the third heavyweight, after Floyd Patterson and Muhammad Ali, to hold The Ring magazine title twice, and is widely considered by media outlets to be the lineal heavyweight champion. As of December 2022, Fury is ranked as the world's best active heavyweight by BoxRec and ESPN. He is also ranked as the second best active boxer, pound-for-pound, by BoxRec, sixth by ESPN and the Boxing Writers Association of America, and seventh by the Transnational Boxing Rankings Board.

As an amateur, Fury represented both England and Ireland, as he was born in Manchester to an Irish Traveller family. Fury's family lineage comes from Belfast and Galway; his parents emigrated to England at a young age. He won the ABA super-heavyweight title in 2008 before turning professional later that year at 20 years of age. After winning the English heavyweight title twice, he became the British and Commonwealth champion in 2011 by defeating the 14–0 Derek Chisora. He then won the Irish and WBO Inter-Continental titles, before defeating Chisora again in a 2014 rematch for the European and WBO International heavyweight titles. This success, along with his 24–0 record, set up a match with the long-reigning world champion Wladimir Klitschko in Germany, which Fury won by unanimous decision.

Fury was stripped of his IBF title 10 days after the Klitschko bout as he was unable to grant a fight with the IBF's mandatory challenger, Vyacheslav Glazkov, due to a rematch clause in his contract with Klitschko. The rematch did not materialise as Fury had mental health issues leading to alcoholism, recreational drug use and extreme weight gain. In 2016, he vacated the WBA, WBO and IBO titles; The Ring stripped him of his last remaining title in early 2018. Later that year, after more than two years of inactivity, Fury challenged for the WBC heavyweight title against Wilder. The fight was controversially scored as a draw. Fury's strong performance against Wilder (including recovering from a heavy knockdown in the final round) earned him Comeback of the Year from The Ring and numerous other awards. In the rematch in February 2020, Fury defeated Wilder by a technical knockout in the seventh round after a dominant performance. He knocked out Wilder again in the trilogy fight in October 2021, this time in the eleventh round.

Early life
Tyson Luke Fury was born in the Wythenshawe area of Manchester on 12 August 1988, the son of Irish Traveller parents Amber and John Fury. He was born three months premature and weighed just . His father named him after American boxer Mike Tyson, who was the heavyweight world champion at the time, and later explained, "The doctors told me there was not much chance of him living. I had lost two daughters in the same way who had been born prematurely." He decided on the name "Tyson" as Fury was "a fighter" and survived the premature birth.

Fury grew up in Styal, Cheshire, and would later often mention his love for both Styal and his birthplace of Manchester. His paternal grandfather was from Tuam, which is also the birthplace of his father. The Furys are ultimately of Gaelic origin, deriving their present surname from Ó Fiodhabhra. His maternal grandmother is from County Tipperary and his mother was born in Belfast. Despite strongly identifying with his Irish heritage, Fury has had problems in gaining dual citizenship because his father's birth in County Galway was not recorded civilly in the 1960s, as Irish Travellers at the time only recorded births through baptism with the church rather than officially with the state. After dethroning Wladimir Klitschko, Fury would quip that "becoming the heavyweight champion of the world is not as hard a fight as proving [his] Irishness".

Fury left school when he was 11, and joined his father and three brothers tarmacking roads. His mother Amber had 14 pregnancies in total, but only four of the children survived. A daughter, Ramona, was born in December 1997 but died within days. This experience has stayed with Fury, who was just nine years old at the time. Fury began boxing at the age of 10. His father, John, trained him until 2011, when he was jailed for gouging out the eye of another Traveller due to a long-standing feud. Fury's uncle Hughie Fury trained him until he died in 2014, after which Fury's other uncle Peter Fury (trainer of son Hughie Fury) trained him in preparation for his fight against Wladimir Klitschko. Peter Fury is also a former boxer, and was previously jailed for 10 years in 1995; he established an amphetamine trafficking network in North West England, and continued to oversee the criminal enterprise while behind bars. Fury himself has not had trouble with the law.

The Fury family has a long history in boxing. Fury's father competed in the 1980s as "Gypsy" John Fury, initially as a bare-knuckle and unlicensed boxer, and then as a professional boxer. John had a professional record of 8–4–1, with one of his losses being to future WBO heavyweight world champion Henry Akinwande. Tyson's half-brother Tommy made his professional debut on 22 December 2018 under the tutelage of two-weight world champion Ricky Hatton. Fury is also a cousin of several professional boxers, including heavyweights Hughie Fury and Nathan Gorman, retired WBO middleweight world champion Andy Lee and light heavyweight contender Hosea Burton. Fury's distant relatives include the bare-knuckle boxers Uriah Burton and Bartley Gorman, both considered "King of the Gypsies", hence Fury's own nickname of "Gypsy King". He has also styled himself as "The Furious One" and "2 Fast" Fury.

Amateur career
As an amateur, Fury represented both England and Ireland. Fury represented Ireland three times at international level. He was based out of the Holy Family Boxing Club in Belfast, Northern Ireland, and later switched to the Smithboro Club in County Monaghan, Ireland. In a double international match against an experienced Polish team in 2007, the Irish team lost 12–6 overall; Fury, however, was victorious in both his fights in Rzeszów and Białystok. In another Irish match against the US, Fury won his bout by knockout. He won bronze at the AIBA Youth World Boxing Championships in 2006.

In England, while representing Jimmy Egan's Boxing Academy in Wythenshawe, Manchester, he participated in the senior national championships in 2006 but was beaten by David Price 22–8. In May 2007, he won the EU Junior Championship, defeating Istvan Bernath in the final. In July 2007 he won silver at the European Junior Championship, losing to Maxim Babanin in the final.

As a junior, Fury was ranked number three in the world behind the Russians Maxim Babanin and Andrey Volkov, but did not get the chance to represent Great Britain at the 2008 Olympics because each country is restricted to one boxer per weight division and David Price was selected. Price came up through the amateur Olympic programme. Fury also unsuccessfully tried to qualify for Ireland. Speaking in 2011, Fury said "I should have gone to the Olympic games in 2008 and won a gold medal for Ireland, but I was denied the chance to go and do it"  He was also forced to withdraw from the Irish national championships after officials from the Holy Trinity Boxing Club in West Belfast, the club of the then Irish amateur heavyweight champion, submitted a protest regarding his eligibility as he was not born in Ireland.

Fury won the ABA super-heavyweight title in 2008 by defeating Damien Campbell 19:1. He turned professional later that year. Feeling disillusioned with amateur boxing, he decided not to wait for the 2012 Olympics. He finished with an amateur record of 31–4 (26 KOs).

Professional career

Early career

Fury made his professional debut at the age of 20 on 6 December 2008 in Nottingham, on the undercard of Carl Froch vs. Jean Pascal against Hungarian fighter Bela Gyongyosi (3–9–2), who Fury defeated via TKO in the first round with a combination to head and body. He then had six more fights in the space of seven months, defeating Marcel Zeller (21–3), Daniil Peretyatko (15–20), Lee Swaby (23–22–2), Matthew Ellis (20–6–1), Scott Belshaw (10–1) and Aleksandrs Selezens (3–6) all via knockout within 4 rounds.

On 11 September 2009, Fury fought John McDermott (25–5, 16 KOs) for the English heavyweight title, and won via a points decision. Fury came in as a 1–6 favourite but produced a poor display, and the 98–92 decision by the referee Terry O'Connor was criticised as a "travesty". The decision led the British Boxing Board of Control to mandate three judges for all English titles, and the board ordered a rematch.

Fury scored two more victories against Tomas Mrazek (4–22–5) and Hans-Joerg Blasko (9–3) before facing McDermott in a rematch on 25 June 2010. Fury settled the controversy of the first fight, as he knocked down McDermott three times, first in the 8th round then twice in the 9th round to win by TKO. Fury won the English heavyweight title for a second time in the process. Another three wins followed: points decisions over American fighters Rich Power (12–0) and Zack Page (21–32–2) in two 8-round matches, and a knockout of the Brazilian Marcelo Luiz Nascimento (13–0) in the 5th round.

On 23 July 2011, Fury faced undefeated heavyweight Derek Chisora for the British and Commonwealth heavyweight titles at Wembley Arena in London. Although Chisora was aged 27 and Fury 22 years old, both men went into the fight with a record of 14–0. Despite Fury's superior size and reach, Chisora was the favourite. After 12 hard-fought rounds Fury won via unanimous decision 117–112, 117–112, and 118–111, with the fight shown live on free-to-air Channel 5. Promoter Mick Hennessy said the fight peaked at around 3 million viewers.

On 17 September 2011, Fury fought 32-year-old fringe contender Nicolai Firtha (20–8–1, 8 KOs) in a non-title bout at the King's Hall, Belfast. Firtha took the fight on two weeks' notice. The opening two rounds were dominated by Fury. In round 3, Firtha landed a big punch which looked to trouble Fury. Fury regained control of the fight by the next round and forced the referee to stop the fight at 2 minutes, 19 seconds on round 5. Fury admitted he got caught flush, "He caught me with a good punch and I had to come back from it." The fight averaged 1.03 million viewers on Channel 5.

Fury returned to the ring on 12 November at the Event City in Trafford Park, Manchester to defend his Commonwealth heavyweight title against undefeated Canadian heavyweight champion Neven Pajkic  (16–0, 5 KOs). Fury had an early scare after being knocked down in round 2 following a big right hand. Although Pajkic hobbled Fury again at the outset of round 3, Fury came back to knock down Pajkic twice during that round. The referee stopped the fight after the last knockdown, causing Pajkic to protest, who declared himself ready to fight on. Many at ringside thought the stoppage premature. The fight averaged 1.72 million viewers on Channel 5.

Fury vacated his British and Commonwealth belts in order to pursue a future world title match. He said to the media of his decision to vacate the belts, "I vacated the British and Commonwealth titles, which some people say are more prestigious than the Irish title, but not to me. I vacated those belts for an Irish title shot because it meant more to me. All my people are from Ireland. I was born in Manchester but I am Irish." On 14 April 2012, Fury travelled to Belfast to fight at the Odyssey Arena for the vacant Irish heavyweight title. His opponent was veteran Martin Rogan (14–2, 7 KOs). Rogan had not fought in 18 months and had not beaten an opponent with a winning record since 2009.  At , Fury was fighting at the lightest weight of his professional career to date. Fury put Rogan on the canvas with a left hook in the third round. Rogan went down again in round 5 from a body shot. Rogan made it to his feet, but the bout was stopped at the request of his corner. The fight averaged 1.33 million viewers on Channel 5.

On 7 July, Fury fought for the vacant WBO Inter-Continental heavyweight title against American boxer Vinny Maddalone (35–7, 26 KOs) at the Hand Arena in Clevedon, Somerset. Maddalone entered with a record of 4–3 in his previous seven bouts. Fury improved his record to 19–0 with 14 stoppage wins, with a fifth-round technical knockout over Maddalone. Fury controlled the fight from the onset and stunned Maddalone with a combination in the opening round. Fury continued to land heavy punches and opened a cut under his opponent's left eye in the fourth. In round 5, with Maddalone taking punches, the referee stepped in and called an end to the bout with blood streaming out of the cut under the veteran's left eye. It was the fifth knockout loss of Maddalone's professional career. In the post-fight interviews, Fury said, "I knew it was a matter of time. I actually called the referee over, he was taking some big shots. I'm still undefeated. I would like to say I'm ready for anyone in the world. Klitschkos, bring them on. Americans, bring them on. Bring on Tomasz Adamek. He's too small for me and I see an early win for me." Promoter Mick Hennessy also stated a world title fight was "two or three fights away", targeting Adamek next. The fight averaged 1.05 million viewers on Channel 5.

Rise up the ranks

Fury vs. Johnson 
On 12 November 2012, it was announced that Fury would fight American world title contender Kevin Johnson (28–3–1, 13 KOs) in a WBC title eliminator at the Odyssey Arena in Belfast on 1 December. Fury said, "Johnson is just the kind of opponent that I want at this stage of my career. We needed a world class fighter and we have got one." Fury won via unanimous decision over Johnson. After 12 rounds, the judges scored it 119–110, 119–108, and 119–108 in favour of Fury. Many media outlets including the BBC and ESPN dubbed the fight as a poor showing. Fury claimed he would score a good win, just as rival David Price did when he stopped Matt Skelton a night earlier, but instead eased to a decision victory. Fury, with the win, was in line to challenge for the WBC title, held at the time by Vitali Klitschko. The fight averaged 1.37 million viewers on Channel 5.

Fury vs. Cunningham 
On 20 February 2013, it was reported that Fury would fight highly ranked American former cruiserweight world champion Steve Cunningham (25–5, 12 KOs) in his United States debut at Madison Square Garden Theater on 20 April. The bout was an IBF title eliminator to determine the number 2 world ranking, with the winner then needing to fight unbeaten Bulgarian heavyweight Kubrat Pulev for the mandatory position for a shot at the long reigning world champion Wladimir Klitschko. Cunningham came into the fight on the rebound from a controversial split decision loss to Tomasz Adamek.

Fury fought wildly in the first two rounds of the bout, and was floored heavily by Cunningham in the 2nd round. Cunningham continued to land heavy punches on Fury for the next few rounds, until being worn down by Fury's size advantage and power punches. By round seven, Fury had fully rebounded and handed Cunningham the first knockout defeat of his career with a cuffing right hand against the rope. Earlier, in round five, Fury was docked a point following a headbutt. At the time of the stoppage, Fury was behind on two judges' scorecards 57–55, while the other judge had it 56–56 (even). A week after the fight, Cunningham spoke to ATG Radio, claiming that Fury used an illegal manoeuvre to knock him out, "He held me with his forearm. He pushed me in the corner twice – which is illegal – and then he pushed me with his forearm, cocked my head to the left and threw a right hook." The fight card aired on NBC in the late afternoon and averaged 1.2 million viewers, peaking at 1.7 million. In the UK, the fight aired on Channel 5 and averaged 1.54 million viewers. The win over Cunningham gave Fury a world ranking of 7 according to BoxRec, a number 2 ranking according to the IBF, 6th with the WBC, and 5th with the WBO.

Cancelled David Haye fight 
Fury was due to fight David Haye (26–2, 24 KOs) on 28 September 2013, in a fight which would have seen Fury fight on a pay-per-view platform for the first time. However, Haye pulled out of the fight on 21 September, after sustaining a cut, which required six stitches, above the eye during training. The fight was originally postponed to 8 February 2014. Haye pulled out of the fight a second time on 17 November, stating that he had a career-threatening shoulder injury which required surgery, and hinted at his retirement. Fury believed that Haye was making excuses because he did not want the fight, saying "I'm absolutely furious but in all honesty this is exactly what I expected. Everyone knows I was very suspicious when he pulled out the first time and this confirms to me that he's always been afraid of me and never wanted this fight." Aside from training camp expenses, Haye also cost Fury his positions in the world rankings including an IBF final eliminator bout which would have made him mandatory for a shot at the world title.

Fury vs. Abell 
On 24 January 2014, it was announced that Fury would fight at the Copper Box Arena against Argentine veteran Gonzalo Omar Basile (61–8, 27 KOs) on 15 February. On 5 February, Basile pulled out of the fight due to a lung infection. He was replaced by American journeyman Joey Abell (29–7, 28 KOs). Fury won the fight via 4th-round TKO, which set up a rematch with Chisora in the summer. Ring rust showed in the opening two rounds with Abell connecting with left hands, which had Fury against the ropes. But Fury managed to compose himself and get behind the jab. In the third round, Fury floored Abell with a right hand. Abell beat the count but was floored again, this time being saved by the bell. Two more knockdowns followed in round 4 ending the fight. After the fight, Fury took to the microphone, "Tyson too fast Fury, that's the name, fighting's the game and these are bums compared to me. I want Wladimir Klitschko, he's avoiding me, let's get it on Wlad."

European heavyweight champion

Fury vs. Chisora II 

Fury was due to fight rival and heavyweight contender Derek Chisora for the second time on 26 July 2014, for the European and once again the British heavyweight title. On 21 July, Chisora was forced to pull out after sustaining a fractured hand in training. Russian Alexander Ustinov was lined up as Chisora's replacement in the bout scheduled to take place at the Manchester Arena, Fury pulled out of the fight after his uncle and former trainer Hughie Fury was taken seriously ill. However, Fury and Chisora rescheduled the rematch for 29 November 2014 at ExCeL London. The bout was also a WBO title eliminator and shown live on BoxNation. Fury was victorious again after dominating the fight up until Chisora's corner pulled him out at the end of the 10th round. Fury also used a southpaw stance for the majority of the fight, despite the traditional right-handed orthodox stance being his preference. Fury used his jab to trouble Chisora and stayed on the outside with his longer reach to dominate the fight. Chisora failed to land any telling punches, and due to Fury's awkward fighting style, ended up hitting him below the belt. Chisora was warned by referee Marcus McDonnell in the first round. After the fight, Fury said, "Wladimir Klitschko, I'm coming for you, baby. I'm coming. No retreat, no surrender." Promoter Mick Hennessy said Fury would likely fight once more before challenging for the world title.

Fury vs. Hammer 
On 26 December 2014, Sky Sports News announced that Fury would fight once more before challenging Klitschko for his world titles. His opponent was Christian Hammer (17–3, 10 KOs) and the fight took place on 28 February 2015 at the O2 Arena in London. Fury said he went for an opponent that would give him a challenge rather than an "easier" opponent, before challenging Klitschko. Fury went on to win the fight when it came to a halt in the 8th round via corner stoppage. Fury dominated the fight from the opening bell and dropped Hammer in round 5 with a short right hook. After the fight, Fury called out Wladimir Klitschko again, stating he was ready for his world title shot.

Unified heavyweight world champion

Fury vs. Klitschko 
In July 2015, it was confirmed that Fury would fight Wladimir Klitschko in a world heavyweight title showdown, for the WBA (Super), IBF, WBO, IBO, Lineal and The Ring heavyweight titles. Initially scheduled for 24 October 2015, the fight was postponed to 28 November 2015 after Klitschko sustained a calf injury. For this match, Fury trained with the highest ranked heavyweight kickboxers in GLORY, Rico Verhoeven and Benjamin Adegbuyi.

The fight took place at Esprit Arena in Düsseldorf, Germany. On fight night, there was controversy with the gloves, then a complaint about the ring canvas. Klitschko reportedly had his hands wrapped without the presence of a Fury representative, so had to do them again. Fury won after 12 rounds by a unanimous decision. The judges scored the fight 115–112, 115–112, and 116–111. Klitschko and Fury showed little offence during the 12 rounds, but Fury was more active and did enough each round to take the decision. Klitschko landed 52 of 231 punches thrown (23%) and Fury landed 86 of 371 thrown (23%).

In the post-fight interview, an emotional Fury said, "This is a dream come true. We worked so hard for this. I've done it. It's hard to come to foreign countries and get decisions. It just means so much to me to come here and get the decision." He then took the microphone and thanked Klitschko, "I'd like to say to Wladimir, you're a great champion. And thanks very much for having me. It was all fun and games during the buildup." Klitschko failed to throw his well-known right hand, mostly due to Fury's constant movement and mocking. He said, "Tyson was the faster and better man tonight. I felt quite comfortable in the first six rounds, but I was astonished that Tyson was so fast in the second half as well. I couldn't throw my right hand because the advantage was the longer distance he had." Klitschko had a rematch clause in place.

On 8 December 2015, the IBF stripped Fury of its title, as the contract for the fight against Klitschko included a rematch clause, precluding Fury from facing the IBF's mandatory challenger Vyacheslav Glazkov. Fury had held the IBF belt for only 10 days.

Relinquishing world titles

Following months of negotiation, the rematch with Klitschko was announced on 8 April 2016, this time with the fight scheduled to take place in Fury's hometown of Manchester at the Manchester Arena on 9 July 2016. On 24 June 2016, it was announced that this fight would be postponed to a later date due to Fury sustaining a sprained ankle in training. On the same day, Fury and his cousin, Hughie Fury, were charged by UK Anti-Doping "with presence of a prohibited substance", namely nandrolone, from a sample taken 16 months previously in February 2015. Tyson and Hughie said that they "strenuously deny" the charge. On 23 September, Fury again postponed the fight after being declared "medically unfit". ESPN reported that Fury had failed a drug test for cocaine a day before the second postponement. Fury cited problems with depression after the positive test for cocaine.

Fury's mental health deteriorated after winning the world titles. On 4 October 2016, in an interview with Rolling Stone, Fury said "I'm going through a lot of personal demons, trying to shake them off, this has got nothing to do with my fighting – what I'm going through right now is my personal life. I've not been in a gym for months. I've been going through depression. I just don't want to live anymore, if you know what I'm saying. I've had total enough of it. Never mind cocaine. I just didn't care. I don't want to live anymore. So cocaine is a little minor thing compared to not wanting to live anymore. I am seeing help, but they can't do nothing for me. What I've got is incurable. I don't want to live. All the money in the world, fame and glory, means nothing if you're not happy. I'm seeing psychiatrists. They say I've got a version of bipolar. I'm a manic depressive. I don't even want to wake up. I hope I die every day. And that's a bad thing to say when I've got three children and a lovely wife isn't it? But I don't want to live anymore. And if I could take me own life – and I wasn't a Christian – I'd take it in a second. I just hope someone kills me before I kill me self. I'll have to spend eternity in hell. I’ve been out drinking, Monday to Friday to Sunday, and taking cocaine. I can't deal with it and the only thing that helps me is when I get drunk out of me mind."

On 12 October 2016, pending investigation on an anti-doping case about his cocaine use, nandrolone findings, and being deemed medically unfit to fight, Fury decided to vacate the WBA (Unified), WBO, IBO heavyweight titles. He said "I won the titles in the ring and I believe that they should be lost in the ring, but I'm unable to defend at this time and I have taken the hard and emotional decision to now officially vacate my treasured world titles and wish the next in-line contenders all the very best as I now enter another big challenge in my life which I know, like against Klitschko, I will conquer." Fury's promoter Mick Hennessy added: "Tyson will still be the lineal world heavyweight champion in everyone's eyes. He beat the most dominant champion in the modern era of boxing on an amazing night in Germany to earn that accolade and that will never change. Whilst it's heartbreaking to see Tyson vacate the world titles that he worked so long and hard for all his life, what's paramount now is that he receives the medical treatment along with the love of his family and friends and the support of the boxing world to make a full recovery." Fury's decision was based on not having to put himself under constant media pressure, allowing him time to recover and receive professional medical help for his mental health problems, and spend time with his family. On 13 October, the British Boxing Board of Control decided to suspend Fury's boxing licence. On 1 February 2018, Fury was stripped of his last remaining title, The Ring magazine's heavyweight championship.

Issues with UKAD and BBBofC
In December 2016, Fury's uncle Peter announced that Fury would be returning around spring in 2017 and would aim for a fight against WBC champion Deontay Wilder. On 23 December, Fury tweeted that he was back in training ahead of a ring return around April or May 2017. His tweet read, "I've had a nightmare 2016, done a lot of stuff I'm not proud of, but my promise to you is I'll return in 2017." On 6 March 2017, Fury tweeted that his return fight would take place on 13 May 2017 and he was speaking to promoter Frank Warren about possible opponents. Warren had become Fury's promoter after Fury dropped his long-time promoter Mick Hennessy. The date set for the return would mean Fury would be fighting on the undercard of Josh Warrington defending his WBC International featherweight title against Kiko Martinez at the First Direct Arena in Leeds. Hours after Fury announced a comeback date, the British Boxing Board of Control (BBBofC) publicly announced that Fury was still suspended and would not be fighting in May. This was confirmed by their general secretary Robert Smith. He also mentioned that there had been no contact from Fury or his representatives since the ban started in October 2016. Warren told Reuters on 7 March, "I want to see him back in the ring as soon as possible but before that happens he's got a couple of issues to sort out." Warren said that along with the dispute with the BBBofC there would need to be a court hearing with UK Anti-Doping (UKAD).

Robert Smith, general secretary of the BBBofC, said in May 2017 that Fury's case was "complex" and it had been adjourned. In September 2017, Fury challenged UKAD to give him a reply, and either ban him or reinstate his boxing licence. He believed he was being treated unfairly as it had taken over a year for them to reply, stating that usually the problem would be dealt with within a matter of months. Fury tweeted, "How long must I be held up and kept out of action? It's been 15 months since I've been under investigation, you're keeping an innocent man from fulfilling his destiny and from providing for his family." UKAD stated there was no particular timescale involved, but denied claims that they were prolonging the hearing. Instead they said they were trying to resolve the matter as soon as possible.

On 8 November 2017, BBC Sport reported that a National Anti-Doping Panel hearing was due to take place in December. Due to the legal battle between Fury and UKAD, it was believed that UKAD could potentially become insolvent or would need a government bail out. UKAD reportedly have an annual budget of £8 million, and the fact that Fury had not fought for two years would have caused potential loss of earnings, possibly over £10 million. UKAD asked the government if they could underwrite the case. On 23 November, according to Robert Smith of the BBBofC, a hearing was set for a date in December 2017. On 25 November 2017, Fury announced his comeback after signing with managerial group MTK Global. A hearing start date of 11 December was set, with a potential outcome being Fury facing a four-year ban. Fury did not attend the hearing and had reporters waiting outside the location for six hours before leaving. Mick Hennessy later stated that Fury was not required at the hearing. On 7 February 2018, UKAD revealed they spent £585,659 on the Fury case. £576,587 was paid to London law firm Bird & Bird, barrister fees came to £1,130 and around £8,000 was paid for laboratory work. UKAD believed they could regain £250,000 through legal insurance.

On 12 December, UKAD announced they had agreed with the Furys and the BBBoC to resolve the charges. "Taking into account the delays in results management that meant charges were not brought in respect of the nandrolone findings until June 2016, and the provisional suspensions that Tyson and Hughie Fury have already effectively served, the two year period of ineligibility is backdated to 13 December 2015, and therefore expires at midnight on 12 December 2017." Tyson's February 2015 win over Christian Hammer was disqualified but his Klitschko triumph was not. Tyson blamed the elevated nandrolone levels on eating uncastrated wild boar and declared his and Hughie's innocence, "Hughie and I have maintained our innocence from day one and we're now happy that it has finally been settled with UKAD and that we can move forward knowing that we'll not be labelled drug cheats." The BBBofC said they would consider the renewal of Fury's boxing licence in January 2018. In relation to the news, Fury wrote on Twitter, "Guess who's back?"

Comeback trail
On 10 January 2018, Fury announced he would be re-applying for his boxing licence through the BBBofC. An interview took place between Fury and BBBofC on 19 January, where the latter agreed to re-instate Fury as long as he sent them up-to-date medical records after visiting a psychologist.  Fury said a motivation on his return was Deontay Wilder. "He said I couldn't do it, he said definitely not Tyson Fury. He's done." At a press conference in London on 12 April 2018, Fury announced he had signed a multi-fight deal with Frank Warren's Queensberry Promotions. He stated that he intended to fight at least three times before 2019, starting on 9 June at the Manchester Arena. After weeks of speculation, it was confirmed the fight would be shown exclusively on BT Sport.

Fury vs. Seferi 
On 20 May 39-year-old Albanian Sefer Seferi (23–1, 21 KOs) was announced as Fury's opponent in a 10-round bout. Seferi was a career cruiserweight, having fought once at heavyweight, when he lost to Manuel Charr in 2016. Fury had lost  for the fight, having experienced extreme weight gain due to his mental health problems. Fury won the fight after Seferi quit on his stool after round 4. The opening couple of rounds had little to no action as Fury was showboating, which referee Phil Edwards warned him for in round 2. A brawl also broke out in the crowd during the fight, but order was restored before the fight came to an end. Fury began to unload heavy shots in round 4 and it appeared many of the shots landed and hurt Seferi, hence he retired on his stool. After the fight, Warren confirmed Fury would next return on the Carl Frampton undercard on 18 August at Windsor Park in Belfast. It was revealed the fight, which aired exclusively on BT Sport 1, peaked at 814,000 live viewers.

Fury vs. Pianeta 
On 12 July 2018, it was announced that Fury would fight former two-time world title challenger Francesco Pianeta (35–4–1, 21 KOs) on 18 August. On 30 July, it was reported that there was ongoing negotiations for a fight to take place in either November or December 2018 between Fury and Wilder (40–0, 39 KOs). On 31 July, Fury stated the fight against Wilder was 99% a done deal, with only a location and date to be confirmed. Fury also had to come through in his bout against Pianeta. Wilder was scheduled to be in Belfast to further promote the fight. Fury went the full 10 rounds, defeating Pianeta via a points decision. Referee Steve Gray scored the fight 100–90 in favour of Fury. Fury later revealed he had no intention of trying to end the fight early. He said, "I think it was a calculated boxing performance. I got 10 rounds with a very tough man under my belt. I was working on my jab, slipping his punches. I thought that was a step up with the opponent and display. I needed the rounds, and I had plenty left in the tank." According to CompuBox, Fury landed 107 of 620 punches thrown (17%). This included 100 power punches landed of 226 thrown (44%). Pianeta landed only 37 of his 228 punches thrown (16%).

During the post-fight interviews, promoter Warren confirmed the Fury vs. Wilder fight was on. The fight would take place in either Las Vegas or New York in November 2018. The fight would be aired on PPV in the United States on Showtime and in the UK on BT Sports Box Office. Talking about how the fight came together, Fury said, "We have two men who will fight anyone. This man has been trying to make a fight with another chump. They called, I answered. I said: 'Send me the contract.' They sent it. I said 'yes'." Warren later told BBC Radio 5 live, "[It's a] 50–50 [purse split], quick and smooth negotiations. He was the world heavyweight champion. He's undefeated. [Wilder and his team] understand that. All of the terms are agreed." By the end of August, contracts for the fight to take place had been signed.

WBC heavyweight title challenge

Fury vs. Wilder 
On 22 September, both Fury and Wilder confirmed they had signed the contract and the fight would take place on 1 December 2018. According to the California State Athletic Commission, Wilder would earn a guaranteed base purse of $4 million and Fury would take home a guaranteed purse of $3 million. Despite Frank Warren's original claim that the revenue would be split 50–50, it was revealed that Wilder could make $14 million (£11 million) and Fury would earn around $10.25 million (£8 million). Both boxers would see this increase to their base purses after receiving their percentages from pay-per-view revenue. The weigh-in took place on 30 November, outside the Los Angeles Convention Center. This was only  lighter than his weigh-in against Francisco Pianeta in August 2018, but he looked leaner.

In front of a crowd of 17,698 at the Staples Center, Wilder and Fury fought a 12-round split decision draw, meaning Wilder retained his WBC title. Mexican judge Alejandro Rochin scored the fight 115–111 for Wilder, Canadian judge Robert Tapper had it 114–112 for Fury and English judge Phil Edwards scored it a 113–113 draw. The crowd booed at the decision with many believing Fury did enough to dethrone Wilder. Fury, using his unorthodox stance, spent much of the fight using upper and lower-body movement to avoid Wilder big shots and stay out of range. There was not much action in round 1 as both boxers used the round to feel each other out. Wilder tried to trap Fury into the corner, but Fury made Wilder miss most of his big swings. In round 4, Wilder bloodied Fury's nose with his stiff jabs, but was unable to follow up on the attacks. In round 6, Fury switched to southpaw stance and had success backing Wilder against the ropes and at the same time stayed cautious of Wilder's power. In round 7, after trading jabs, which saw Fury come out on top, Fury landed a counter right hand, then quickly tied Wilder up before he could throw anything back. Round 8 saw back and forth action with both trying to land. Wilder threw a lot of power shots which Fury mostly evaded. In round 9, Wilder finally dropped Fury with a short left hook followed by an overhand right. Fury beat referee Jack Reiss’ count and survived the round. Having expended a lot of energy trying to finish Fury in round 9, Wilder looked fatigued in round 10. This came to as an advantage for Fury as he landed two right hands. Fury also took advantage in round 11, landing enough shots and avoided anything Wilder could throw. In round 12, Wilder landed a right-left combination which put Fury down hard on his back. The crowd, commentary team and Wilder believed the fight was over. Reiss looked at Fury on the canvas and began giving him a count. To everyone's surprise, Fury beat the count. Reiss made Fury walk towards him and called for the action to continue. Wilder, fatigued again, was unable to land another power shot and Fury landed some right hands to finish the round and the fight on his feet. Both boxers embraced in a hug after the final bell sounded.

According to CompuBox statistics, Wilder landed 71 punches of 430 thrown (17%), and Fury landed 84 of his 327 thrown (26%). Wilder was much less accurate in this fight than he usually had been in previous fights. Fury out-landed Wilder in 9 out of the 12 rounds. Both Wilder and Fury only landed double digits in 4 separate rounds. After the fight, both men gave in-ring interviews. Wilder stated, "I think with the two knockdowns, I definitely won the fight. We poured our hearts out tonight. We're both warriors. I rushed my punches. I didn't sit still. I was too hesitant. I started overthrowing the right hand, and I just couldn't adjust. I was rushing my punches. That's something I usually don't do." Fury said, "We're on away soil. I got knocked down twice, but I still believe I won that fight. I'm being a total professional here. God bless America. The 'Gypsy King' has returned. That man is a fearsome puncher, and I was able to avoid that. The world knows I won the fight. I hope I did you all proud after nearly three years out of the ring. I showed good heart to get up. I came here tonight, and I fought my heart out." Wilder and Fury both claimed to be the best heavyweights in the world and both called out unified world champion Anthony Joshua. Fury shouted, "Chicken! Chicken! Joshua, where are you?" Wilder then agreed to state the two best heavyweights got into the ring and fought.

The event was both a critical and a commercial success. The fight sold approximately 325,000 pay-per-view buys on Showtime in the United States, grossing around $24 million, making it the most lucrative heavyweight fight in the country since 2003. Showtime's delayed broadcast a week later drew an average 488,000 viewers and peaked at 590,000 viewers. Despite the commercial success of the fight, promoter Bob Arum believes it was meagre in comparison to the bout's potential. Arum said Fury vs. Wilder II could surpass Floyd Mayweather Jr. vs. Manny Pacquiao, which grossed over $600 million, saying: "They were the little guys, here we have the biggest men in the sport."

Establishing himself in Las Vegas

Fury vs. Schwarz 
After the fight with Wilder, Fury secured a five-fight contract with ESPN and Top Rank worth £80 million ($100 million). He made his return to the ring at the MGM Grand Garden Arena in Las Vegas against the WBO Inter-Continental heavyweight champion Tom Schwarz (24–0, 16 KOs) on 15 June 2019. This was Fury's first fight in Las Vegas. Schwarz was ranked #2 by the WBO and #9 by the IBF at the time. He was in complete control of the fight, peppering the undefeated Schwarz in round one before finishing him in the second round by TKO, to take Schwarz's WBO Inter-Continental title. During the fight, Fury purposely backed up against the ropes and let Schwarz unload, using head movement to evade the strikes and generating applause from the 9,000 people in attendance.

Fury vs. Wallin 
Fury fought again in Las Vegas against former WBA Continental heavyweight champion Otto Wallin (20–0, 13 KOs) on 14 September, at the T-Mobile Arena. Promoter Frank Warren said: "It is another undefeated boxer he is facing and a contest where a victory will set up the Deontay Wilder rematch." Wallin was ranked #4 by the WBA and #12 by the IBF at heavyweight. The Swedish southpaw Wallin came in at exactly . Fury won by unanimous decision 116–112, 117–111, and 118–110. Fury suffered a serious cut above his right eye in the third round from a short left hook, as well as a cut over his right eyelid from an accidental clash of heads in the fifth which affected his vision for the rest of the fight and prompted a ringside doctor to be consulted in the sixth. After an examination, Fury said he was able to continue and the doctor agreed. In the second half of the fight, Fury repeatedly hit Wallin with solid shots. Wallin came back in the twelfth with his best punch of the fight, a clean left hand which momentarily troubled Fury. After tying Wallin up in a clinch, Fury saw out the round, receiving the decision victory and the WBC Mayan belt, a commemorative title awarded to the winner of a high-profile fight held during Mexican national holidays. According to CompuBox, Fury landed 179 of 651 total punches (27%) while Wallin connected with 127 of 334 total punches (38%). Of these total punches, Fury landed 127 power punches to Wallin's 84. In his in-ring interview, Fury praised the performance of Wallin, who was a more than 10–1 underdog, and expressed condolences as Wallin's father had recently died. Fury then called out Wilder for a rematch in February 2020.

WBC and The Ring heavyweight champion

Fury vs. Wilder II 

On 27 November 2019, ESPN announced that Fury would face Deontay Wilder on 22 February 2020, in a rematch of their bout in 2018, which resulted in a controversial draw. In the build-up to the rematch, Fury split with trainer Ben Davison, who had coached Fury since late 2017 and helped him lose the large amount of weight he had gained during his hiatus and restore him to fighting condition. Davison was nominated for 2018 Trainer of the Year due to his role in Fury's successful return to the ring. The split was described as amicable and Davison wished Fury good luck in the rematch against Wilder. Fury then announced he had partnered with SugarHill Steward, nephew of Hall-of-Fame trainer Emanuel Steward, and that he would return to Kronk Gym, where he briefly trained in 2010. The rematch was officially announced on 27 December 2019, and the venue was set as the MGM Grand Garden Arena in Las Vegas. The fight contract included a clause in which the loser can invoke a trilogy fight if he chooses.

He stated in the lead-up to the fight that he wanted extra size and power to look for a knockout. Fury started the fight by taking the centre of the ring and establishing his jab. He looked for some big shots, while evading Wilder's swings. In the third round, Fury floored Wilder with a strong right hand to the temple. Wilder beat the count and survived the round but was visibly disoriented, as blood began to stream from his left ear. Wilder fell to the canvas twice more, but they were ruled as slips by the referee Kenny Bayless, before Fury knocked Wilder down again in the fifth round with a quick combination punctuated by a left hook to the body. Wilder made it to his feet again, but was unable to muster much in the way of a counterattack and he was now bleeding from the mouth as well as the ear. The fight was stopped midway through the seventh round after a flurry of hard-hitting shots from Fury caused Wilder's corner to throw in the towel to save him from further punishment. At the time of stoppage, Fury was ahead on all three judges' scorecards 59–52, 58–53, and 59–52, with the irregular scores due to Bayless deducting a point from Fury in the fifth for holding. According to CompuBox, Fury landed 82 of his 267 total punches (31%), including 58 out of 160 power punches (36%). Wilder landed 34 of his 141 total punches (24%), including 18 out of 55 power punches (33%).

According to CompuBox, Fury landed 82 of his 267 total punches (31%), including 58 out of 160 power punches (36%). Wilder landed 34 of his 141 total punches (24%), including 18 out of 55 power punches (33%). Fury received widespread praise for his performance, with many believing that it established one of the best boxing comeback stories ever seen, and some stating that the victory placed him as one of the greatest heavyweight boxers in history. It made him the first man to defeat two champions who had 10 or more defences of their world championship (Klitschko with 18 defences, and Wilder with 10 defences). Fury also became the third heavyweight, after Muhammad Ali and Floyd Patterson, to hold The Ring magazine title twice, and the first heavyweight in history to have held the WBA (Super), WBC, IBF, WBO, and The Ring magazine titles. With a gate of $16,916,440, the fight broke the gate record for a heavyweight bout in Nevada set by Evander Holyfield vs. Lennox Lewis II in November 1999.

Fury vs. Wilder III 

Deontay Wilder activated the clause for a second rematch fight with Tyson Fury after his loss to Fury in the first rematch. The trilogy fight was tentatively scheduled for July 2020, but this was later postponed due to the COVID-19 pandemic. On 11 June 2020, Anthony Joshua's promoter Eddie Hearn announced that Fury and Joshua had agreed a two-fight deal, provided that Fury defeated Wilder and Joshua defeated his mandatory challenger, Kubrat Pulev. Fury's promoter Bob Arum said in August 2020, "the WBC approved the trilogy contract and that provides for postponements. And certainly, if you can't do it with spectators, a reasonable postponement would be okay. It's a different kind of fight."

On 12 October 2020, Fury announced that he was foregoing a trilogy fight with Wilder after organizers failed to deliver a date for the event in 2020. The Athletic reported "Fury had every intention of fighting Wilder in 2020 and made several concessions regarding rescheduled dates. However, he was unwilling to allow this situation to drag out, delaying a series of fights with Joshua while also keeping him out of the ring for an extended period of time."

On 17 May 2021, the proposed unification fight between Fury and Joshua was thrown into serious doubt when arbitration judge Daniel Weinstein ruled that Fury will have to honour a contractual clause which mandates a third fight with Wilder. Subsequently, Bob Arum claimed that the Allegiant Stadium in Las Vegas had been reserved for 24 July in anticipation of Fury's trilogy fight with Wilder. On 22 May 2021, Fury announced during the broadcast of José Ramírez vs. Josh Taylor on ESPN that he had signed the contract for the Wilder trilogy fight, which ESPN showed footage of Fury signing. It was also confirmed by Wilder's manager Shelly Finkel that his fighter had signed the contract, and that the fight was on. Ahead of their pre-fight press conference on 15 June, the venue was officially confirmed as T-Mobile Arena in Las Vegas, where Fury had previously defeated Otto Wallin by unanimous decision on 14 September 2019. The bout was postponed from the original date of 24 July until 9 October, after Fury's camp had an outbreak of COVID-19. At the pre-fight weigh-in on 8 October, both men weighed in at their respective career-heaviest weights, with the champion Fury weighing in at 277 lbs (19 st 11 lb), and the challenger Wilder at 238 lbs (17 st).

On the night, both men exchanged a total of five knockdowns as Fury won the bout via eleventh-round knockout. Wilder had started the first round well, jabbing the champion to the body and landing several clean right hands to his chest and stomach, doing enough to win the first round on all three judges' scorecards. In the second, Fury landed some good shots in the clinch. Midway through the third, Fury sent Wilder to the canvas with a series of hard right hands, and continued to pummel him as Wilder was effectively saved by the bell. Wilder came back in the fourth with a vicious short right hand that put Fury down on the canvas. Wilder continued coming forwards, and sent the champion down again towards the end of the round. In the middle rounds, Fury recovered and started landing with more regularity, racking up a commanding lead on the cards and marking up Wilder's face badly, with the latter now visibly exhausted as a result of all of the punishment he had taken. In the tenth, Wilder was decked by a huge right hook, but came back yet again with a huge series of wild swings that caught Fury at the bell. With Wilder badly hurt and bleeding, Fury managed to finish his opponent in the eleventh round with a clean right hook thrown from the clinch. Referee Robert Mora waved the contest off with Wilder face-down on the canvas. After the fight, Fury praised his opponent, calling Wilder a "top fighter", but criticised him for being a "sore loser" and refusing to "show any sportsmanship or respect". In his post-fight interview, Fury stated "I'm a sportsman. I went over to him to show some love and respect and he didn't show it back. I will pray for him so that God will soften his heart." Fury then added that it "was a great fight tonight, worthy of the best of trilogies." Fury asserted his view that he is the best boxer in his division, stating "I'm now the greatest heavyweight of my era, without a doubt."

At the time of the stoppage, Fury was winning the bout on all three scorecards with 95–91, 94–92, and 95–92. According to CompuBox, Fury landed 150 of 385 punches (39%), while Wilder connected with 72 of 355 punches (20%). The 150 punches landed on Wilder is the most ever landed by an opponent. Despite the back and forth nature of the bout, CompuBox calculated Fury as having outlanded Wilder in every single round of the fight, including the fourth round in which Fury was knocked down twice. The fight was widely acclaimed by observers and pundits for its action and high-level intensity: hall-of-fame promoter Bob Arum said, “I’ve been in this business 57 years promoting fights and I have to say I’ve truly never seen a heavyweight fight as magnificent as this", while the Ring magazine described it as "the obvious fight of the year so far" and "a rare and historic heavyweight championship trilogy".

Fury vs. Whyte 

On 30 December 2021, WBC president Mauricio Sulaiman, who had ordered Fury to defend his WBC title against mandatory challenger Dillian Whyte, ruled that Fury as the reigning champion would be entitled to 80% of the purse, compared to Whyte's 20% as the challenger. Sulaiman had set a deadline of 11 January 2022 for purse bids, as the two fighters' camps could not agree to terms. However, this deadline was pushed back multiple times, in part due to ongoing negotiations from Fury's team who were trying to secure the fight for the undisputed heavyweight championship against undefeated WBA (Super), IBF and WBO heavyweight champion Oleksandr Usyk. A fight between Fury and Usyk did not materialise, as deposed former champion Anthony Joshua was unwilling to step aside to allow the two champions to fight.

The deadline for the Fury-Whyte purse bids was ultimately scheduled for 28 January 2022, when it was announced that Frank Warren's Queensberry Promotions had won the rights to promote the fight, with a winning bid of $41,025,000 (£31 million), beating out the $32,222,222 (£24 million) bid submitted by Eddie Hearn's Matchroom. Warren's bid was reported to be the highest successful purse bid in boxing history. Fury reacted to the news, stating on social media that he is "coming home", suggesting that the fight against Whyte would be the first time he would box on U.K. soil since his August 2018 win against Francesco Pianeta. On 25 February, it was officially announced that the fight would be taking place at Wembley Stadium in London, England on 23 April.

The first press conference for the fight took place on 1 March at Wembley Stadium, with Whyte absent. Whyte's lawyer stated that his client would not be partaking in promoting the fight, as "we still do not have things resolved". Despite his opponent's non-attendance, Fury as usual was "in full showman mode", declaring, "Even Tyson Fury versus his own shadow sells", and promising that the fight "is going to be a Ferrari racing a Vauxhall Corsa". When asked about Whyte's no-show, Fury opined, "He's definitely shown the white flag in my estimation." In addition, he stated that his bout against Whyte would be the final fight of his professional career, promising to retire after the fight: "I'm a two-time undisputed world champion. [I have] £150m in the bank and nothing to prove to anybody."

Tickets for the fight went on sale on 2 March. 85,000 of the 90,000 available tickets were sold within the first 3 hours, prompting Fury's promoter Frank Warren to begin the process of applying to the local authorities to expand the capacity to 100,000 fans, which would make Fury-Whyte the largest post-war boxing attendance in the history of the United Kingdom. The contest ultimately took place in front of a record-breaking crowd of 94,000 fans: 4,000 more than the attendance of Anthony Joshua vs. Wladimir Klitschko which also took place at Wembley Stadium in 2017, thus setting a new attendance record for a boxing match in Europe.

Fury was given a rousing reception by the crowd as he made his way to the ring in an attire of red and white, paying homage to Saint George's Day to the backdrop of "Juicy" by The Notorious B.I.G. and "Sex on Fire" by Kings of Leon, in contrast to the boos received by his opponent Whyte during his own ring-walk. Whyte unexpectedly boxed the first round in the southpaw stance, which was unusual for the primarily orthodox fighter. After a cautious first three minutes, Fury returned the favour at the start of the second round by switching between the southpaw and orthodox stances. The champion found success with the jab and check hook. In the fourth round, Whyte was cut over his right eye after a clash of heads. Fury continued to dominate the fight, landing a straight right in the fifth round which appeared to momentarily stun the challenger. With around ten seconds left of the sixth round, Fury landed a left jab, followed by a right uppercut which sent Whyte sprawling to the canvas. Although Whyte was able to beat the count and rise to his feet, the referee deemed it unsafe for him to continue, halting the fight after two minutes and fifty-nine seconds of the sixth round, declaring Fury the winner by sixth-round technical knockout. At the time of the stoppage, Fury was winning the bout on all three scorecards with 49–46, 48–47, and 50–45.

In his post-fight ring interview, Fury claimed that the fight against Whyte was the last of his professional boxing career: "I've been in this game 20 years, I'm 34 in a few months. I said the third Wilder fight would be my last but I felt I owed the fans one last homecoming. This is definitely the end of the Gypsy King and I went out with a bang. Tonight was amazing but this is the end." Fury appeared to have no regrets, stating, "I fulfilled everything I've ever wanted to fulfil. I will retire as only the second heavyweight in history, after Rocky Marciano, to retire undefeated. I was unbeatable at this game."

He announced his retirement on 12 August 2022 and relinquished his Ring title.

Fury vs. Chisora III 

On 20 October 2022, it was announced that Fury would return from his short-lived retirement to defend his WBC title against Derek Chisora in a trilogy bout on 3 December at Tottenham Hotspur Stadium in London, live on BT Sport Box Office.

On the night of the fight, Fury defeated Chisora via 10th-round TKO in front of a crowd of 60,000 fans, in a dominant performance. After the fight, Fury called on fellow undefeated heavyweight champion Oleksandr Usyk, who was seated ringside at the Tottenham Hotspur Stadium, to join him between the ropes. Usyk obliged, stepping up to the ropes before facing a barrage of abuse from Fury, who indicated his preference to face Usyk as his next opponent. Fury suggested that if the Usyk fight could not be made next for whatever reason, he would be happy to face WBO interim champion Joe Joyce, who had also joined Fury and Usyk ringside post-fight.

Professional wrestling

Fury made an appearance in an angle on WWE's debut of SmackDown on Fox on 4 October 2019. Appearing as a fan, he stared down Braun Strowman during his match, and Strowman later threw one of his opponents, Dolph Ziggler, at Fury. After the match, Fury jumped the barricade, but was stopped by security. On 11 October, it was confirmed that Fury and Strowman would have a match at WWE Crown Jewel. At Crown Jewel on 31 October, Fury defeated Strowman via countout. Fury reportedly earned £11.9 million ($15 million) for his participation. Fury later made an appearance on the 8 November episode of SmackDown at the Manchester Arena, shaking hands with Strowman and suggesting they form a tag team together before both being challenged by the B-Team (Bo Dallas and Curtis Axel), who they left laying in the ring.

On 3 September 2022, Fury was in the audience of WWE Clash at the Castle. During the main event between Roman Reigns and Drew McIntyre, Fury prevented Austin Theory from interfering by knocking him out. After the match, Fury helped the defeated McIntyre up, then after assuring him that he did well, the two led the crowd into some songs.

Other ventures
In September 2019, Penguin Random House imprint Century secured the publishing rights to Fury's autobiography, titled Behind the Mask: My Autobiography. It was released on 14 November 2019 and reached the number-one bestseller position on Amazon with 24 hours of its release.

Fury appeared in a four-part ITV documentary named Meet the Furys, which followed the Fury family while Tyson was preparing to fight in Las Vegas for the first time. ITV later commissioned another documentary about Fury, titled Tyson Fury: The Gypsy King, which showed Fury and his family during the build-up to the Wilder rematch.

Known for his habit of impromptu singing, Fury regularly gained media attention for singing songs in the boxing ring after matches and during promotional events. In 2019, Fury appeared as a guest vocalist on English singer-songwriter Robbie Williams' studio album The Christmas Present, for the song "Bad Sharon".

Fury has expressed an interest in competing in mixed martial arts. In November 2019, he had a training session with Darren Till, who said there is a 70% chance that Fury will compete in MMA. Fury also mentioned that Conor McGregor has offered to train him should he crossover to MMA.

In November 2020, Fury's second book entitled The Furious Method was published. A self-help book, it is "full of inspirational advice for readers on how we can all improve our physical and mental health". The book was a commercial success, and is a Sunday Times bestseller.

In February 2022, Fury launched a new range of energy drinks named Furocity Energy to rival market leaders Red Bull and Monster Energy.

In August 2022, Fury and Netflix announced that a new multi-part documentary featuring Fury and his family had begun production with the working title "At Home With The Furys."

On 11 November 2022, Fury released his first official single, a version of "Sweet Caroline". All proceeds raised from the single are to go to men's mental health charity, Talk Club.

Public image
After Fury became world champion in 2015, the British media began to scrutinise what he had said in the past. He received criticism for having said that he would "hang" his sister if she was promiscuous, as well as comments made in an interview before the Klitschko fight in which he denounced abortion, paedophilia, and homosexuality, saying that the legalisation of these behaviours would bring forth a Biblical reckoning.

Fury was nominated for the 2015 BBC Sports Personality of the Year Award but around 140,000 people signed a petition claiming that his equation of homosexuality with paedophilia should disqualify him. When asked about the petition by a BBC journalist, Fury quoted religious phrases, including "believe in the Lord Jesus Christ and you will be saved," along with John 3:16: "For God so loved the world, He gave His only begotten Son, whoever believes in Him shall have eternal life and shall not perish." Fury ultimately came fourth in the SPOTY award and said at the ceremony, "I've said a lot of stuff in the past and none of it is with intentions to hurt anybody. I apologise to anyone that's been hurt by it." He also was criticised for comments on bestiality, transgender people, and "Zionist Jewish people who own all the banks, all the papers, all the TV stations" in a May 2016 interview. The interview was later deleted and Fury apologised: "I said some things which may have hurt some people, which as a Christian man is not something I would ever want to do. Though it is not an excuse, sometimes the heightened media scrutiny has caused me to act out in public and then my words can get taken out of context. I mean no harm or disrespect to anyone and I know more is expected of me as an ambassador of British boxing and I promise in future to hold myself up to the highest possible standard."

Fury was formerly known for his attention-grabbing antics, such as arriving at a press conference in a Lamborghini and wearing a Batman costume. After his hiatus, he has said that he does not want to "play a character anymore". He stated in November 2017, "I feel I have a story to tell, a massive one. The stuff I've been through, depression, mental health problems. It can help and inspire others. From 18 stone to 27. From a clean living man to drugs and alcohol and back to the heavyweight world champion again. I hope the legacy and story I leave behind will help others in the future of what to do and not to do." Although Fury has vowed to rein in his entertaining behaviour, he is still known for his vibrant personality, with promoter Bob Arum stating that he "hasn't seen a fighter with that much charisma since Muhammad Ali". Since his return to the ring and his strong performance against Wilder, Fury has been dubbed "The People's Champion" due to his open and honest discussion about his mental health struggles. He is currently an Ambassador for the former British world champion Frank Bruno's mental health charity, The Frank Bruno Foundation.

In June 2020, Fury publicly thanked Daniel Kinahan for his role in brokering a potential Tyson Fury vs. Anthony Joshua fight. In 2018, an Irish High Court judge stated that Kinahan, who has no previous criminal convictions, is a senior figure in organised crime on a global scale. The Irish government expressed its "outrage" over the involvement of Kinahan in the brokering of the proposed fight. On 24 June 2020, it was announced that Fury had parted ways with Kinahan as an advisor. However, in June 2022, Fury was refused entry to the United States, apparently a result of his links with Kinahan.

Personal life
Fury met his wife Paris (née Mullroy) when she was 15 and he was 17. They began dating the year after they met, and married in 2008 at St. Peter in Chains Catholic Church in Doncaster, South Yorkshire. The couple have six children together: three sons (all named Prince) and three daughters. When Fury was asked why all of his sons had the first name Prince, he said, "I'm a king and they're princes until they earn their rightful name." He named his first son Prince after Prince Naseem, his favourite British fighter. Paris suffered a miscarriage before Fury's cancelled bout with Ustinov in 2014, and lost another child on the day of his comeback fight against Seferi in 2018.

Fury's mother was a Protestant and his father is a Catholic, though neither actively practised their religions; he was instead introduced to religion by his uncle, a born-again Christian and Pentecostal preacher in the Irish Traveller community. The Guardian described Fury's beliefs as "a mixture of traditional Roman Catholic... and a particularly literal interpretation of evangelical Christianity". His wife is a practising Catholic and was also raised in an Irish Traveller family.

Fury and his family reside in Morecambe, Lancashire. He also owns a home in Las Vegas, but decided to let his boxing trainer live there because he is unsure about spending more time in the US. In September 2015, he expressed an interest in running to be an independent MP for Morecambe and Lunesdale, stating that the government was too focused on providing services for immigrants and not enough on homeless people and those with drug and alcohol problems. 

In April 2016, Fury spoke about the racial abuse he receives as an Irish Traveller, stating that "no one wants to see a Gypsy do well". He stated, "I am a Gypsy and that's it. I will always be a Gypsy, I'll never change. I will always be fat and white and that's it. I am the champion yet I am thought of as a bum." Since his return from his hiatus, Fury has stated that he still feels bias against his community.

Fury is a fan of Manchester United FC and attends football matches at their home ground Old Trafford. He also supports the England national team.

In his political sympathies during the 2022 Russian invasion of Ukraine, Fury has stipulated in preliminary negotiations for a title fight with Usyk that he would accept a 70-30 split of the purse favoring his side and agreed that he would make a one million dollar donation to the Ukraine war effort against Russia regardless of a win or a loss in the title fight.

Professional boxing record

Television viewership

International

Pay-per-view bouts

United States

United Kingdom and Ireland

See also

 List of world heavyweight boxing champions
 List of WBA world champions
 List of WBC world champions
 List of IBF world champions
 List of WBO world champions
 List of IBO world champions
 List of The Ring world champions
 List of European Boxing Union heavyweight champions
 List of British heavyweight boxing champions
 List of Commonwealth Boxing Council champions

Notes

References

External links

1988 births
Living people
English people of Irish descent
English male boxers
Irish Travellers from England
Irish Traveller sportspeople
Boxers from Manchester
People from Wythenshawe
England Boxing champions
Irish male boxers
World heavyweight boxing champions
World Boxing Association champions
World Boxing Council champions
World Boxing Organization champions
International Boxing Federation champions
The Ring (magazine) champions
International Boxing Organization champions
European Boxing Union champions
Super-heavyweight boxers
People with mood disorders
Commonwealth Boxing Council champions
British Boxing Board of Control champions
Doping cases in boxing
English sportspeople in doping cases
Fury family